The coat of arms of Vågsøy is an official symbol for Vågsøy Municipality in Sogn og Fjordane county, Norway.  The coat of arms depicts two rudders in silver on a blue background. The rudders are of the special kind that are traditionally used on boats in the area. The arms symbolize guidance or control on land and sea. The coat of arms was designed by the artist Inge Rotevatn.

References

Vagsoy
Vågsøy